Mohammad Abshak (born January 27, 1987, in Rasht, Iran) is an Iranian footballer.

Club career
Abshak starts his career with Sepidrood youth team. In 2007, after playing 3 seasons for Sepidrood, he joined Pegah that just got promoted to Iran Pro League, but could not play a single game for them because of army services, so he joined Fajr Gilan instead.
In 2008—after fishing his army services—he returned to Pegah in Iran Pro League but could not play a single game again due injury. In October 2008, Pegah was sold and renamed to Damash Gilan. In the next season, Damash was relegated to Azadegan League and Firouz Karimi was appointed as a Head Coach. Abashk could prove himself to Karimi and was the starter in most of games. Since then, he has been a member of the team and one of its key players

Club statistics
Last Update  9 April 2016

Honours
Foolad
Hazfi Cup: 2020–21
Iranian Super Cup: 2021

References

External links
Iran Pro League Stats
persianleague.com

1987 births
Living people
People from Rasht
Iranian footballers
Damash Gilan players
Sanat Mes Kerman F.C. players
Rah Ahan players
Malavan players
Nassaji Mazandaran players
Foolad FC players
Persian Gulf Pro League players
Association football midfielders
Sportspeople from Gilan province